The Senu River is a river in Sandaun Province, Papua New Guinea.

See also
List of rivers of Papua New Guinea
Senu River languages

References

Rivers of Papua New Guinea